Haïdra is a municipality in western Tunisia, containing the ruins of Ammaedara, one of the oldest Roman cities in Africa. It was a diocese and is now a Roman Catholic titular see.

History 
Ammaedara was on the border between the valleys and the Berber tribes and was part of the Roman province of Byzacena.

The Third Augustan Legion (Legio III Augusta) was installed in Ammaedara in 30 BC where they built their first fortress. From here the legion was partly responsible for the urbanisation of the North African provinces, building roads and other infrastructure. Its ruins include mausoleums, Byzantine fortresses, underground baths and a church.

Ecclesiastical history 
Excavation of what has been called the Church of Melleus in the centre of Ammaedara has brought to light the tombs of some bishops of the see. In addition, documentary records survive of Eugenius, a bishop of Ammaedara, who participated in the Council of Carthage (255), which discussed the question of the lapsi, and of Speratus and Crescentianus, representing respectively the Catholics and the Donatists of the city, who took part in the Council of Carthage (411) of 411. Later Catholic bishops were Hyacinthus and Melleus, both of the second half of the 6th century.

Given the Roman province, it must have been a suffragan of the Metropolitan archbishop of its capital Hadrumetum (modern Sousse, also in Tunisia).

Titular see 
No longer a residential bishopric, Ammaedara is today listed by the Catholic Church as a titular see. The diocese was nominally restored as Ammædæra of Ammædera and renamed Ammædara in 1925.

It has had the following incumbents, all of the lowest (episcopal) rank :
 Mathieu Sislian (1909.12.03 – 1915.08.30)
 Joseph Raphael John Crimont, Jesuits (S.J.) (1917.02.15 – 1945.05.20)
 Joseph Gerald Holland, Society of African Missions (S.M.A.) (1946.07.11 – 1950.04.18)
 Jacob Abraham Theophilos Kalapurakal (1950.07.25 – 1956.06.27)
 Joseph-Rolland-Gustave Prévost-Godard (趙玉明), Société des Missions-Étrangères du Québec (Society of Foreign Missions; P.M.E.) (1956.11.11 – 2005.11.13)
 Pierre Nguyễn Văn Đệ, Salesians (S.D.B.) (2005.11.29 – 2009.07.25)
 Vincent Nguyen (Nguyễn Mạnh Hiếu) (2009.11.06 – ...), Auxiliary Bishop of Toronto (Canada)

Notable people 
 Ahmed Jdey (10 June 1951 – 20 July 2012), author, historian and professor.

References

Source and External links 
 GigaCatholic with titular incumbents biography links

Populated places in Kasserine Governorate
Communes of Tunisia
Roman legionary fortresses in Tunisia
Roman fortifications in Roman Africa
Roman towns and cities in Africa (Roman province)